Vanitas (Latin for 'vanity') is a genre of art which uses symbolism to show the transience of life, the futility of pleasure, and the certainty of death. The paintings involved Still life imagery of transitory items. The genre began in the 16th century and continued into the 17th century. Vanitas art is a type of allegorical art representing a higher ideal.

Etymology 
The word vanitas comes from Latin and means vanity. Vanity is referenced in the bible's Old Testament in Ecclesiastes 12: 8 "Vanity of Vanities, saith the preacher, all is vanity". The message is that human action is temporary and faith is forever.

Vanitas, is a sub-genre of still life painting which Dutch painters during the Baroque period (c.1585-1730) employed. The Spanish painters also created vanitas paintings which coincided with the end of the Spanish Golden Age. Memento mori is a similar theme which when translated from Latin means, "remember that you will die."

History 
A group of painters in Leiden began to produce vanitas paintings beginning in the 16th century and they continued into the 17th century. Vanitas art is a type of allegorical art representing a higher ideal or containing hidden meanings. Vanitas are very formulaic and they use literary and traditional symbols to convey mortality. Vanitas often have a message that is rooted in religion or the Christian bible.

In the 17th century the vanitas genre was popular among Dutch painters in the seventeenth century. The paintings often have symbolic imagery which attempts to convey the message that we will die, and we should think about futility of our earthly pursuits. The well known Spanish vanitas refer to Spain's rulers and the politics of Spain. It was popular to include skulls in vanitas paintings. In the 17th century, a skull symbolized the ephemeral nature of life.

Outside visual art 
The first movement in composer Robert Schumann's 5 Pieces in a Folk Style, for Cello and Piano, Op. 102 is entitled Vanitas vanitatum: Mit Humor.
Vanitas vanitatum is the title of an oratorio written by an Italian Baroque composer Giacomo Carissimi (1604/05–1674).
Vanitas is the seventh album by British Extreme Metal band Anaal Nathrakh.
Vanitas is the name of a character from the Kingdom Hearts franchise.
Vanitas is the name of one of the two main characters from Vanitas no Carte
Vanitas is the motto of The Harvard Lampoon

In modern times 
Jana Sterbak, Vanitas: Flesh Dress for an Albino Anorectic, artwork, 1987.
Alexander de Cadenet, Skull Portraits, various subjects, 1996 – present.
Philippe Pasqua, series of skulls, sculpture, 1990s – present.
Anne de Carbuccia, One Planet One Future, various subjects, 2013 – present.

Gallery

See also 
Mortality salience
Sic transit gloria mundi

References

External links 

Vanitas in the London National Gallery
Vanités An exhibition at Musée Maillol, Paris
vanitas (art) – Encyclopædia Britannica
"An Exploration of Vanitas: The 17th Century and the Present", online exhibit at Google Arts & Culture

Christian art about death
Visual arts genres
Iconography
Memento mori